The Wudu Dam is a concrete gravity dam on the Fu River located  north of Jiangyou in Sichuan Province, China. The primary purpose of the dam is irrigation and it is part of the Sichuan Wudu Irrigated Agricultural Development Project. The dam also provides flood control and supports a 150 MW power station. Construction on the dam began on 1 November 2004 and excavation in March 2005. Pouring of roller-compacted concrete began in 2006 and the dam was complete in 2008. The last generator was commissioned in 2010.

See also

List of dams and reservoirs in China
List of major power stations in Sichuan

References

Dams in China
Hydroelectric power stations in Sichuan
Gravity dams
Dams completed in 2008
Roller-compacted concrete dams